Venetian Village is a census-designated place (CDP) in Lake County, Illinois, United States. Per the 2020 census, the population was 2,761.

Geography
Venetian Village is located in northwestern Lake County at  (42.398871, -88.047845), in the southeast part of Lake Villa Township. It consists of several neighborhoods adjacent to four lakes: Sand Lake, Slough Lake, Miltmore Lake, and Fourth Lake. The neighborhood of Venetian Village is in the eastern part of the CDP, while West Miltmore is in the west.

Illinois Route 83 runs along the western edge of the CDP, leading north  to the center of Lake Villa and south  to Grayslake. Illinois Route 132 passes the northern edge of Venetian Village, leading west into Lake Villa and southeast  to Gurnee.

Demographics

2020 census

Note: the US Census treats Hispanic/Latino as an ethnic category. This table excludes Latinos from the racial categories and assigns them to a separate category. Hispanics/Latinos can be of any race.

2000 Census
As of the census of 2000, there were 3,082 people, 1,119 households, and 835 families residing in the CDP. The racial makeup of the CDP was 94.78% White, 1.14% African American, 0.13% Native American, 0.81% Asian, 1.20% from other races, and 1.95% from two or more races. Hispanic or Latino of any race were 4.02% of the population.

There were 1,119 households, out of which 39.9% had children under the age of 18 living with them, 64.2% were married couples living together, 6.6% had a female householder with no husband present, and 25.3% were non-families. 20.8% of all households were made up of individuals, and 5.1% had someone living alone who was 65 years of age or older. The average household size was 2.75 and the average family size was 3.22.

In the CDP, the population was spread out, with 28.9% under the age of 18, 6.3% from 18 to 24, 35.6% from 25 to 44, 21.8% from 45 to 64, and 7.4% who were 65 years of age or older. The median age was 35 years. For every 100 females, there were 105.3 males. For every 100 females age 18 and over, there were 105.3 males.

The median income for a household in the CDP was $57,829, and the median income for a family was $61,923. Males had a median income of $41,926 versus $30,354 for females. The per capita income for the CDP was $23,504. About 1.3% of families and 3.0% of the population were below the poverty line, including none of those under age 18 and 2.2% of those age 65 or over.

References

Census-designated places in Illinois
Census-designated places in Lake County, Illinois